Crosley Bendix Radio Reviews is a collection of recordings edited from a wealth of material broadcast on KPFA's Over the Edge radio show, hosted by Negativland member Don Joyce weekly.  Each recording on this particular disc comes from a different broadcast, all featuring the character Crosley Bendix.

As a regular feature on Over the Edge, Crosley Bendix (dubbed the "Director of Stylistic Premonitions for The Universal Media Netweb") presents Monologues on cultural phenomena, with a typically "Negativland" sense of humor throughout.  The selections here are fairly broad examples of Crosley's critical style.  Probably his most famous monologue regards the discovery of a new primary color, called "Squant."

This album was released in 1993 by Negativland's own label, Seeland Records, as a CD.

Track listing

Style (1989 - 6:15)
Domestic Art (1987 - 11:33)
Squant (1993 - 8:41)
Movies (1987 - 7:13)
Dance (1988 - 7:25)
Progress (1984 - 3:25)
Numbers (1985 - 3:52)
Electricity (1987 - 7:38)
Fear (1986 - 5:57)
Technology (1987 - 9:14)

Personnel
Don Joyce
Kings House (Rob Wortman, Brook Hinton, Arne Ryason)

Negativland albums
1993 compilation albums